The Wyoming ground squirrel (Urocitellus elegans) is a species of rodent in the family Sciuridae. It is endemic to the Northwestern United States.

References 

 A pale mutation in the ground squirrel: An Albinoid Color-phase in Citellus elegans Resembling the Recessive Cream Mutation in the Rat. Frank H. Clark and William L. Jellison, J Hered (1937) 28 (7), pages 259–260, 
 Life-history studies of the Wyoming ground squirrel (Citellus elegans elegans) in Colorado. William L. Burnett, Bulletin of the Colorado Agricultural Experiment Station, 1931 (URL)

Urocitellus
Endemic fauna of the United States
Fauna of the Northwestern United States
Mammals of the United States
Natural history of Wyoming
Mammals described in 1863
Taxonomy articles created by Polbot